The São Tomé white-eye (Zosterops feae) is a species of bird in the family Zosteropidae. It is endemic to the island of São Tomé, where it occurs in the central massif and in the southwest. Its natural habitat is mid- to high-altitude forests. It is threatened by habitat loss. It was named by the Italian Tommaso Salvadori in 1901.

References

Melo, M., B.H. Warren, and P.J. Jones. 2011. Rapid parallel evolution of aberrant traits in the diversification of the Gulf of Guinea white-eyes (Aves, Zosteropidae). Molecular Ecology. Published online 21 May 2011. doi: 10.1111/j.1365-294X.2011.05099.

Birds described in 1901
Endemic birds of São Tomé and Príncipe
Endemic fauna of São Tomé Island
Zosterops
Taxonomy articles created by Polbot